Hundsheimer Berg is a hill located in the Hundsheimer Berge hill range in Lower Austria, Austria close to the border with Slovakia. The north slopes of the Hundsheimer Berg are covered with forests while the southern slopes have a steppe vegetation. Since 1965, a nature reserve with the same name, Hundsheimer Berg, is located on these southern slopes.

References 

Geography of Lower Austria